The Solomon Islands participated at the 2018 Summer Youth Olympics in Buenos Aires, Argentina from 6 October to 18 October 2018.

Athletics

Futsal

1 team of 10 athletes

Boys' tournament

Group stage

Weightlifting

The Solomon Islands were given a quota by the tripartite committee to compete in weightlifting.

References

2018 in Solomon Islands sport
Nations at the 2018 Summer Youth Olympics
Solomon Islands at the Youth Olympics